Austin Armacost (born March 28, 1988) is an American reality television personality who rose to fame in 2010 as a cast member in the Logo reality television series The A-List: New York which followed the lives of six gay and bisexual men in New York City.

In 2015, he competed in the sixteenth series of Celebrity Big Brother, where he became runner-up. He re-entered the house in 2017 during the nineteenth series as an "All Star" in which he was the fourth to leave the house, placing fifteenth.

Personal life
Armacost was married to a British man named Jake Lees for eight years. They separated in 2016.

Austin celebrated his one-year anniversary with new boyfriend, IT Business Architect Darren Banks in September 2017.

Celebrity Big Brother
On 27 August 2015, Armacost entered the Celebrity Big Brother house as a housemate in the sixteenth series competing for "Team USA" and finished as runner up to James Hill. Following their appearance in the series, both Austin and James won "TV Moment of the Year" at The Attitude Awards 2015.

He returned again as an All-Star for Celebrity Big Brother 19 and was evicted in a twist, which saw him voted as the "dullest housemate". He finished in fifteenth place.

Filmography

See also
 LGBT culture in New York City

References

Living people
1988 births
Big Brother (British TV series) contestants
Celebrity Big Brother
American male models
Place of birth missing (living people)
Participants in American reality television series
21st-century American LGBT people